Evan Shinners (born 1986 in Denver, Col.,) is an American pianist, clavichordist, and electronic music composer. He often performs under the pseudonym WTF Bach, and is the founder of The Bach Store, a pop-up venue which transforms vacant storefronts into temporary concert spaces. A devoted specialist to the music of J.S. Bach, he is the creator of the WTF Bach Podcast. He is a winner of the Inaugural Alumni Enterprise Award from the Music Academy of the West, and is a Yamaha Artist.

Evan Shinners is a graduate of The Juilliard School, where he studied with Jerome Lowenthal.

Discography

As Evan Shinners
 @Bach (2011) 
 J.S. Bach Toccatas BWV 910-916 (2013) 
 J.S. Bach English Suites (2018)
 J.S. Bach French Suites (2018)
 J.S. Bach Organ Sonatas (2018)
 The Shape of Bach to Come (2018)
 J.S. Bach Complete Fantasies for Solo Keyboard  (2020)

As W.T.F. Bach
 Jello Sweets (2016)
 Shining Charles (HUGE VIBE) (2016)
 Englisch (2019)
 V!va (2019)

References

1986 births
Living people
Musicians from Denver
American male pianists
Clavichordists
American male composers
Juilliard School alumni